NWL may refer to:

Business
 National Wholesale Liquidators, a New York-based operator of warehouse-style closeout discount stores
 Northumbrian Water Limited, a water company in the United Kingdom
 Newell Brands, an American worldwide marketer of consumer and commercial products listed on the NYSE as NWL

Music
 NWL (album), a 2015 pop album by American musician MAX
 Neverending White Lights, a collaborative music project by Canadian musician Daniel Victor

Sports
 NASPA Word List, word list used in North American English Scrabble
 Northwest League, a Minor League Baseball league in the northwest United States and western Canada 
 Northwoods League, a collegiate summer baseball league in the United States and Canada

Technology
 NetWare Lite, a peer-to-peer network solution for DOS created by Novell